The Italian ambassador in Bratislava is the official representative of the Government in Rome to the Government of Slovakia.

List of representatives 
<onlyinclude>

See also

 List of ambassadors to Slovakia

References 

 
Slovakia
Italy